Leroy Vinnegar (July 13, 1928 – August 3, 1999) was an American jazz bassist. Born in Indianapolis, Indiana, United States, the self-taught Vinnegar established his reputation in Los Angeles, California, during the 1950s and 1960s. His trademark was the rhythmic "walking" bass line, a steady series of ascending or descending notes, and it brought him the nickname "The Walker". Besides his jazz work, he also appeared on a number of soundtracks and pop albums, notably Van Morrison's 1972 album, Saint Dominic's Preview.

Music career
He recorded extensively as both a leader and sideman. He came to public attention in the 1950s as a result of recording with Lee Konitz, André Previn, Stan Getz, Shorty Rogers, Chet Baker, Shelly Manne, Joe Castro and Serge Chaloff.

He played bass on Previn and Manne's My Fair Lady album, one of the most successful jazz records ever produced. He also performed on another of jazz's biggest hit albums, Eddie Harris and Les McCann's Swiss Movement, released in 1969. Vinnegar also performed at the Lighthouse in Hermosa Beach, California, and Diggers in East Los Angeles in the late 1950s, with drummer and pianist Don Joham along with other musicians. He moved to Portland, Oregon in 1986. In 1995, the Oregon State Legislature honored him by proclaiming May 1 Leroy Vinnegar Day.

Vinnegar died of a heart attack, at the age of 71, on August 3, 1999, in a hospital in Portland.

Discography

As leader
 Leroy Walks! (Contemporary, 1958)
 Leroy Walks Again!! (Contemporary, 1963)
 Jazz's Great "Walker"  (Vee Jay, 1964)
 Glass of Water (Legend, 1973)
 The Kid (PBR, 1974; Q-Tape, 2005)
 Walkin' the Basses (Contemporary, 1992)

As sideman
With Pepper Adams
Pepper Adams Quintet (Mode, 1956)
With Stan Getz and Lionel Hampton
 Hamp and Getz (Norgran, 1955)
With Chet Baker
 Quartet: Russ Freeman/Chet Baker (Pacific Jazz, 1956)
With Tom Ball and Kenny Sultan
 Who Drank My Beer? (Kicking Mule, 1983)
 Bloodshot Eyes (Flying Fish, 1986)
With Conte Candoli
 West Coast Wailers (Atlantic, 1955) with Lou Levy
 Little Band Big Jazz (Crown, 1960)
With Benny Carter
 Jazz Giant (Contemporary, 1958)
 Swingin' the '20s (Contemporary, 1958)
Sax ala Carter! (United Artists, 1960)
BBB & Co. (Swingville, 1962) with Ben Webster and Barney Bigard
With Joe Castro
 Live at Falcon's Lair! (Pablo, 1956)
 Groove Funk Soul (Atlantic, 1959)
 At Falcon's Lair with Joe Castro (1959)
With Serge Chaloff
 Blue Serge (Capitol, 1956)
With Dolo Coker
 Dolo! (Xanadu, 1976)
 California Hard (Xanadu, 1977)
 Third Down (Xanadu, 1977)
Xanadu in Africa (Xanadu, 1980) with Al Cohn, Billy Mitchell and Frank Butler
Night Flight to Dakar (Xanadu, 1980) with Al Cohn, Billy Mitchell and Frank Butler
With Buddy Collette
 Nice Day with Buddy Collette (Contemporary, 1957)
With Sonny Criss
 Saturday Morning (Xanadu, 1975)
With The Doors
 Waiting for the Sun (Elektra, 1968)
With Barbara Dane & Earl Hines
 Livin' with the Blues (Dot, 1959)
With Kenny Dorham
 Inta Somethin' (Pacific Jazz, 1961)
With Kenny Drew
 Talkin' & Walkin' (Jazz: West, 1955)
 Home Is Where the Soul Is (Xanadu, 1978)
 For Sure! (Xanadu, 1978)
With Harry Edison
"Sweets" for the Sweet (Sue, 1964)
With Teddy Edwards
Teddy Edwards at Falcon's Lair (MetroJazz, 1958)
 It's About Time (Pacific Jazz, 1959)
 Sunset Eyes (Pacific Jazz, 1960)
 Teddy's Ready! (Contemporary, 1960)
 Good Gravy! (Contemporary, 1961)
 Heart & Soul (Contemporary, 1962)
Young at Heart (Storyville, 1979) with Howard McGhee
Wise in Time (Storyville, 1979) with Howard McGhee
Mississippi Lad (Verve/Gitanes, 1991)
With Victor Feldman
Vic Feldman on Vibes (Mode, 1957)
With Red Garland
 Keystones! (Xanadu, 1977)
With Stan Getz
 West Coast Jazz (Norgran, 1955)
 Hamp and Getz (Verve, 1955)
 Stan Getz and the Cool Sounds (Verve, 1953–55, [1957])
 The Steamer (Verve, 1956)
With Dexter GordonDaddy Plays the Horn (Bethlehem, 1955)Dexter Blows Hot and Cool (Dooto, 1955)
With Eddie Harris and Les McCann
 Swiss Movement (Atlantic, 1969)
With Hampton Hawes
 The Sermon (Contemporary, 1958 [1987])
 Something Special (Contemporary, 1976 [1994])
With Elmo Hope
 The Elmo Hope Quintet featuring Harold Land (Pacific Jazz, 1957)
With The Jazz Crusaders
 Live at the Lighthouse '66 (Pacific Jazz, 1966)
 Talk That Talk (Pacific Jazz, 1966)
With Fred Katz
 Fred Katz and his Jammers (Decca, 1959)
With Barney Kessel
 Let's Cook! (Contemporary, 1957 [1962])
With Eric Kloss
 First Class Kloss! (Prestige, 1967)
With Harold Land
 Harold in the Land of Jazz (Contemporary, 1958)
With Gordon Lee
 On the Shoulders of Giants (Unity Label Group, 1994)
With Shelly Manne
 Concerto for Clarinet & Combo (Contemporary, 1955 [1957])
 Swinging Sounds (Contemporary, 1956)
 More Swinging Sounds (Contemporary, 1956)
 Shelly Manne & His Friends (Contemporary, 1956)
 My Fair Lady (Contemporary, 1956)
With Les McCann
 Les McCann Ltd. Plays the Truth (Pacific Jazz, 1960)
 Les McCann Ltd. Plays the Shout (Pacific Jazz, 1960)
 From the Top of the Barrel (Pacific Jazz, 1960 [1967])
 On Time (Pacific Jazz, 1962)
 Les McCann Plays the Hits (Limelight, 1966)
 Bucket o' Grease (Limelight, 1967)
 Much Les (Atlantic, 1968)
 Fish This Week (United Artists, 1973)
With Howard McGhee
 Maggie's Back in Town!! (Contemporary, 1961)Young at Heart (Storyville, 1979) with Teddy EdwardsWise in Time (Storyville, 1979) with Teddy Edwards
With Frank MorganFrank Morgan (Gene Norman Presents, 1955)
With Van Morrison
 Saint Dominic's Preview (Warner Bros., 1972)
With Gerry Mulligan and Ben Webster
 Gerry Mulligan Meets Ben Webster (Verve, 1959)
With Phineas Newborn, Jr.
 The Great Jazz Piano of Phineas Newborn Jr. (Contemporary, 1963)
 The Newborn Touch (Contemporary, 1964)
With Art Pepper
 The Return of Art Pepper (Jazz: West, 1956)
With Carl PerkinsIntroducing Carl Perkins (Dootone, 1956)
With Randy Porter
 Modern ReflectionsWith Sonny Rollins
 Sonny Rollins and the Contemporary Leaders (Contemporary, 1958)
With Shorty Rogers
 Martians Come Back! (Atlantic, 1955)
 Way Up There (Atlantic, 1955 [1957])
With Jimmy Smith
 Bluesmith (Verve, 1972)
With Sonny Stitt
 Sonny Stitt Blows the Blues (Verve, 1959)
 Saxophone Supremacy (Verve, 1959)
 Sonny Stitt Swings the Most (Verve, 1959)
With Cedar Walton
 Cedar! (Prestige, 1967)
With Tut Taylor
 12 String Dobro (World Pacific Records, 1964)
With Jessica Williams
 Encounters (Jazz Focus, 1994)
 Encounters II (Jazz Focus, 1997)
With Don Wilkerson
 The Texas Twister (Riverside, 1960)
With Gerald Wilson
 Portraits (Pacific Jazz, 1964)
With Jack Wilson
 The Two Sides of Jack Wilson'' (Atlantic, 1964)

References

1928 births
1999 deaths
American jazz double-bassists
Male double-bassists
African-American jazz musicians
West Coast jazz double-bassists
Jazz musicians from California
Musicians from Los Angeles
Musicians from Indianapolis
Musicians from Portland, Oregon
Contemporary Records artists
Fantasy Records artists
Vee-Jay Records artists
20th-century American musicians
20th-century double-bassists
20th-century American male musicians
American male jazz musicians
20th-century African-American musicians